Sulfurisphaera is a genus of the Sulfolobaceae.

Description and significance
Sulfurisphaera is a facultatively anaerobic, thermophilic, Gram-negative archaeon that occurs in acidic solfataric fields. The organism grows under the temperature range of 63–92 °C with the optimum temperature at 84 °C, and under the pH range of 1.0–5.0, with an optimum of pH 2.0. It forms colonies that are smooth, roundly convex, and slightly yellow.

Genome structure
The genome of Sulfurisphaera is yet to be sequenced. The G + C content is estimated to be 30–33%.

Cell structure and metabolism
The spherical cells of Sulfurisphaera ohwakuensis are 1.2–1.5 µm in diameter. Thin sections of the organism reveal an envelope (approx. 24 nm) surrounding the cell membrane. It grows organotrophically on proteinaceous, complex substrates such as yeast extract, peptone, and tryptone. Growth was not observed on single sugars or amino acids such as D-glucose, D-galactose, D-fructose, D-xylose, lactose, maltose, sucrose, alanine, glutamate, glycine, and histidine.

Ecology
The strains of Sulfurisphaera ohwakuensis were isolated from multiple locations in the acidic hot springs in Ohwaku Valley, Hakone, Japan.

References

Further reading

Scientific journals

Scientific books

External links

Sulfurisphaera at BacDive -  the Bacterial Diversity Metadatabase

Archaea genera
Thermoproteota